= Juanita Brooks Wade =

Bostonian African American community organizer

Juanita Brooks Wade is a community activist. She was an elected member of the Boston School Committee, and was also the third woman of color to be elected to the Boston School Committee. Wade was also the Chief of Human Services for the City of Boston and executive director of Boston Centers for Youth and Family.

Wade was known for her promotion of history of African Americans were not prominent individuals.

In 2023, she was recognized as one of "Boston’s most admired, beloved, and successful Black Women leaders" by the Black Women Lead project.
